Gocha R. Tsetskhladze ( – 11 September 2022) was a Georgian-born British classical archaeologist who studied in Ukraine, Russia and England, at the University of Oxford. He taught at Royal Holloway, University of London and Melbourne University. Tsetskhladze became director of the central Anatolian Pessinus excavation site in 2009. His area of specialisation was Greek colonization. He previously worked on excavations of Greek colonies located along the Black Sea coasts of Georgia, Russia, and the Ukraine.

Tsetskhladze died on 11 September 2022, at the age of 59.

References

1960s births
Year of birth missing
2022 deaths
21st-century archaeologists
21st-century people from Georgia (country)
Alumni of the University of Oxford
Archaeologists from Georgia (country)
Classical archaeologists